This is a list of airports in Taiwan, grouped by type and sorted by number of passengers.

Airports
Airport names shown in bold indicate the airport currently has regular international flights.

See also
 Transportation in Taiwan
 List of airports by ICAO code: R#RC - Taiwan
 Wikipedia: WikiProject Aviation/Airline destination lists: Asia#China, Republic of (Taiwan)

Notes

References

External links
Lists of airports in Taiwan:
Great Circle Mapper
FallingRain.com
Aircraft Charter World
The Airport Guide
World Aero Data

Taiwan
 
Lists of buildings and structures in Taiwan
Taiwan transport-related lists
Taiwan